Ayr Thistle Football Club was a Scottish football team from the town of Ayr.

History

Founded in 1872, out of a cricket club, Ayr Thistle originally played the rugby football code, but switched to association football thanks to the influence of Queen's Park.

In 1876-77, Thistle reached the Semi-Final of the Scottish Cup, being defeated 9–0 by Vale of Leven at a snowy Kinning Park, then home of Rangers.  Thistle did not concede until the 32nd minute, and the score was still only 2-0 at half-time, the second of which had been a Vale counter-attack; Vale's superior fitness told in the second half and two further Vale goals were counted as disputed.

In 1879, Ayr Thistle merged with Ayr Academicals to form Ayr, who, in 1910, merged with Ayr Parkhouse to form Ayr United.

Colours

The club's colours were blue and black.

Grounds

The club played at the Low Green, before moving to Thistle Park in 1875 and eventually Robbsland Park in 1876.

Notable players

Archie Hunter, later an FA Cup winner with Aston Villa, played as a back for Thistle in the 1876-77 season

References

Ayr United F.C.
Defunct football clubs in Scotland
Association football clubs established in 1872
1872 establishments in Scotland
Association football clubs disestablished in 1879
1879 disestablishments in Scotland
Sport in Ayr
Football in South Ayrshire